Stephen Leonard Shields (born March 9, 1965) is an American college basketball coach and most recently the head men's basketball coach at the University of Arkansas at Little Rock.  He took over as head coach prior to the start of the 2003–04 season.

Shields began his tenure at Arkansas–Little Rock as an assistant to Porter Moser in 2000, and served as his assistant until 2003, when Moser left to take the head coaching position at Illinois State University.

Prior to joining the Trojans' staff, Shields had worked as an assistant for six years at three different community colleges before accepting the head job in 1996 at McLennan Community College, where he had previously spent time as an assistant.

Shields started his collegiate career as a basketball player at Oklahoma City University, where he sat out his freshman year as a redshirt.  He transferred and played basketball for one year at McLennan Community College before transferring again to Baylor University.  Shields played golf for his father at Baylor, earning all-conference honors.  He graduated in 1988 with a degree in education.

On March 18, 2015, Shields was let go by the Arkansas–Little Rock administration after 12 seasons. He left as the winningest coach in the Trojans' history.

Head coaching record

References

1965 births
Living people
American male golfers
American men's basketball coaches
American men's basketball players
Baylor Bears men's basketball players
College men's basketball head coaches in the United States
High school basketball coaches in the United States
Junior college men's basketball players in the United States
Little Rock Trojans men's basketball coaches
McLennan Community College alumni
Pensacola State Pirates men's basketball coaches
Place of birth missing (living people)